Nipholepis is a little-known fungal genus in the order Arthoniales. The genus has not been placed into a family. It is a monotypic genus, containing the single species Nipholepis filicina, found in Venezuela. Both the genus and species were described in 1935 by German mycologist Hans Sydow. Nipholepis filicina is an epiphytic fungus, living on the surface of plant leaves. Sydow found the fungus forming minute white flecks on the lower frond surfaces of the fern Diplazium expansum, the upper surface of which was covered in algae, mosses, and lichens. He noted a resemblance to the lichen Myxotheca hypocreoides, a member of the family Arthoniaceae.

References

Arthoniomycetes
Monotypic Ascomycota genera
Taxa described in 1935
Taxa named by Hans Sydow